Joseph Dennis (christened 6 January 1779; died 16 November 1831) was an English first-class cricketer. He played for Nottingham Cricket Club from 1800 to 1829.

A batsman and occasional wicket-keeper, Dennis took part in seven first-class matches, six for Nottingham, mostly against Sheffield Cricket Club, and one for a combined Nottinghamshire and Leicestershire side in 1803. He retired from cricket after the 1828 season because of failing vision, but he was persuaded to play in 1829.

Dennis was landlord of the Eclipse Inn at Chapel Bar in Nottingham and had a reputation for gambling: in 1815, he laid a bet worth £120 on a local match and won. He suffered a stroke in 1831 and died shortly afterwards, only a month after the death of his wife.

References

External links

1778 births
1831 deaths
English cricketers
English cricketers of 1787 to 1825
English cricketers of 1826 to 1863
Nottingham Cricket Club cricketers